The  (CNES; French: Centre national d'études spatiales) is the French government space agency (administratively, a "public administration with industrial and commercial purpose"). Its headquarters are located in central Paris and it is under the supervision of the French Ministries of Defence and Research.

It operates from the Toulouse Space Centre and the Guiana Space Centre, but also has payloads launched from space centres operated by other countries. The president of CNES is Philippe Baptiste. CNES is a member of Institute of Space, its Applications and Technologies. It is Europe's largest and most important national organization of its type.

History 
CNES was established under President Charles de Gaulle in 1961. It is the world's third oldest space agency, after the Soviet space program (Russia), and NASA (United States). CNES was responsible for the training of French astronauts, until the last active CNES astronauts transferred to the European Space Agency in 2001.

, CNES is working with Germany and a few other governments to start a modest research effort with the hope to propose a LOX/methane reusable launch vehicle by mid-2015.  If built, flight testing would likely not start before approximately 2026. The design objective is to reduce both the cost and duration of reusable vehicle refurbishment, and is partially motivated by the pressure of lower-cost competitive options with newer technological capabilities not found in the Ariane 6.

Summary of major events 

 1947: CIEES/Hammaguir missile range and launch facility built for the French military in French Algeria.
 1961 CNES founded.
 1962 First Berenice rocket launched.
 1963 CNES became the first—and only—space agency to successfully launch a cat into space.
 1964 Diamant Launch Vehicle introduced.
 1965 First French satellite put in orbit. 
 1967 Hammaguir range closed.
 1968 Toulouse Space Centre completed.
 1969 French Guiana Space Centre completed.
 1973 Évry Space Centre completed.
 2014 E-CORCE Earth observation satellite launched

Programs 
CNES concentrates on five areas:
Access to space
Civil applications of space
Sustainable development
Science and technology research
Security and defence

Access to space

France was the third space power (see Diamant) to achieve access to space after the USSR and USA, sharing technologies with Europe to develop the Ariane launcher family. Commercial competition in space is fierce, so launch services must be tailored to space operators' needs. The latest versions of the Ariane 5 launch vehicle can launch large satellites to geosynchronous orbit or perform dual launches—launching two full-size satellites with one rocket—while the other launch vehicles used for European payloads and commercial satellites—the European/Italian Vega and Russian Soyuz-2—are small and medium-lift launchers, respectively.

Sustainable development
CNES and its partners in Europe—through the Global Monitoring for Environment and Security initiative (GMES)—and around the world have put in place satellites dedicated to observing the land, oceans, and atmosphere, as well as to hazard and crisis management. The best-known are the SPOT satellites flying the Vegetation instrument, the Topex/Poseidon, Jason-1 and Jason-2 oceanography satellites, the Argos system, Envisat, and the Pleiades satellites.

Civil applications
CNES is taking part in the Galileo navigation programme alongside the European Union and the European Space Agency (ESA), and—in a wider international context—in the Cospas-Sarsat search-and-rescue system.

Security and defense
The aforementioned Galileo navigation programme, though intended primarily for civilian navigational use, has a military purpose as well, like the similar American Global Positioning System and Russian GLONASS satellite navigational systems.

In addition to Spot and the future Pleiades satellites, CNES is working for the defence community as prime contractor for the Helios photo-reconnaissance satellites.

Global Monitoring for Environment and Security—a joint initiative involving the EU, ESA, and national space agencies—pools space resources to monitor the environment and protect populations, though it also encompasses satellite support for armed forces on border patrol, maritime security, and peacekeeping missions.

Ongoing missions
France's contribution to the International Space Station is giving French scientists the opportunity to perform original experiments in microgravity. CNES is also studying formation flying, a technique whereby several satellites fly components of a much heavier and complex instrument in a close and tightly controlled configuration, with satellites being as close as tens of meters apart. CNES is studying formation flying as part of the Swedish-led PRISMA project and on its own with the Simbol-x x-ray telescope mission.

CNES currently collaborates with other space agencies on a number of projects, including orbital telescopes like INTErnational Gamma-Ray Astrophysics Laboratory, XMM-Newton, and COROT and space probes like Mars Express, Venus Express, Cassini-Huygens, and Rosetta. CNES has collaborated with NASA on missions like the Earth observation satellite PARASOL and the CALIPSO environment and weather satellite.

It has also collaborated with the Indian Space Agency (ISRO) on the Megha-Tropiques Mission, which is studying the water cycle and how it has been impacted by climate change. CNES plays a major role in the ESA's Living Planet Programme of Earth observation satellites, having constructed the Soil Moisture and Ocean Salinity satellite.

UFO Archive

In December 2006, CNES announced that it would publish its UFO archive online by late January or mid-February. Most of the 6,000 reports have been filed by the public and airline professionals. Jacques Arnould, an official for the French Space Agency, said that the data had accumulated over a 30-year period and that UFO sightings were often reported to the Gendarmerie.

In the last two decades of the 20th century, France was the only country whose government paid UFO investigators, employed by CNES's UFO section GEPAN, later known as SEPRA and now as GEIPAN.

On March 22, 2007, CNES released its UFO files to the public through its website. The 100,000 pages of witness testimony, photographs, film footage, and audiotapes are an accumulation of over 1,600 sightings since 1954 and will include all future UFO reports obtained by the agency, through its GEIPAN unit.

Tracking stations
The CNES has several tracking stations. A partial list follows:
 Kourou in French Guiana
 Issus Aussaguel, 20 km away from Toulouse
 Kerguelen Island, French Southern and Antarctic Lands
 Hartebeesthoek, South Africa
 Kiruna, Sweden, for the SPOT program

See also  
 French space program
 European Space Agency
 List of government space agencies

References

External links

 CNES — Homepage 
 CNES — Homepage 
 CNES — UFO Data

 
Space agencies
Space program of France
Organizations based in Paris
Organizations established in 1961
1961 establishments in France